Back to the Grindstone is the twentieth studio album by American country music artist Ronnie Milsap, released on March 12, 1991. The album produced four singles, three of which reached the top ten on the Billboard country singles chart, including "Are You Lovin' Me Like I'm Lovin' You," "Since I Don't Have You," a cover of The Skyliners' 1958 standard and "Turn That Radio On." The fourth single, "All Is Fair in Love and War" peaked at number 11. Milsap produced the album with Rob Galbraith, with further assistance from Richard Landis on "Since I Don't Have You".

The album reached number 24 on country charts, and was Milsap's last crossover until Then Sings My Soul in 2009, peaking at number 172 on the Billboard 200. Allmusic praised Milsap for a "gutsy [and] powerful performance" on the record, stating that "not one of the ten songs...is weak." The publication characterized it as "one of his best albums," lauding the performer's "eclectic, soul-inflected R&B" style.

Track listing

Personnel
Ronnie Milsap - lead vocals
Mark Casstevens, Vince Gill (track 3), Don Potter - acoustic guitar
Jamie Brantley (track 7), Steve Brantley (track 7), Carol Chase, Paul Davis, Bruce Dees, Vicki Hampton (track 6), The Boys Choir of Harlem (track 6), Donna McElroy (track 6), Ronnie Milsap, Michael Mishaw (track 6), Cindy Richardson-Walker, Lisa Silver, Robert Jason Singers (track 1), Scat Springs (track 6) - backing vocals
David Hungate, Bob Wray - bass
Paul Leim, Larrie Londin (track 2) - drums
Paul Davis (track 8), Shane Keister - drum programming
Patti LaBelle - duet vocals on "Love Certified"
Dave Baker, Larry Byrom, Bruce Dees, Steve Gibson, Jon Goin, John Hiatt (track 9), Chuck Jones, Mark Knopfler (track 2), Dean Parks, Brent Rowan - electric guitar
Terry McMillan - harmonica
Quitman Dennis, Mike Haynes, Jim Horn, Frank Kavelin, Charles Rose, Denis Solee, George Tidwell - horns
Chuck Jones, J.D. Martin, Bergen White - horn arrangements
Mitch Humphries, Shane Keister, Larry Knechtel, Ronnie Milsap, Jay Spell - keyboards
Farrell Morris - percussion
Jim Horn - saxophone solos
Sonny Garrish, Weldon Myrick - steel guitar
Charlie Calello - string arrangements, conductor
Shane Keister, Mike Lawler - synthesizer

Chart performance

Weekly charts

Year-end charts

Singles

References

Back to the Grindstone RCA Tracklist, letssingit.com.

1991 albums
Ronnie Milsap albums
RCA Records albums
albums arranged by Charles Calello
albums produced by Richard Landis